ŠK Kremnička was a Slovak football team, based in the town of Banská Bystrica. The club was founded in 1952 and dissolved in Summer 2017, after decision of club's owner Milan Smädo to save youth teams of collapsed club MFK Dukla Banská Bystrica and continuous with a long tradition of the name Dukla.

References

External links 
Futbalnet profile 
Official club website 
 
at bystricoviny.sk 

Defunct football clubs in Slovakia
Sport in Banská Bystrica
Association football clubs established in 1952
Association football clubs disestablished in 2017
1952 establishments in Slovakia